Taylor Forge Engineered Systems is an American manufacturer of liquid separation equipment for the pipeline industry. It was formed in 1984 when Gulf and Western sold its Taylor Forge operations in Paola, Kansas and Greeley, Kansas to private investors. The company also has manufacturing facilities in Garnett, Kansas and Tulsa, Oklahoma.
In June 2015, TFES completed work on its largest project, a 12-finger inlet slug catcher weighing nearly 378,000 pounds, destined for BP's Shah Deniz natural gas project in Azerbaijan.

References

Manufacturing companies of the United States
Petroleum production